Gage Hill is a tuya in east-central British Columbia, Canada, located in Wells Gray Provincial Park.

See also
List of volcanoes in Canada
Volcanism of Canada
Volcanism of Western Canada

References

Volcanoes of British Columbia
One-thousanders of British Columbia
Tuyas of Canada
Monogenetic volcanoes
Pleistocene volcanoes